Novosedly may refer to places in the Czech Republic:

Novosedly (Břeclav District), a municipality and village in the South Moravian Region
Novosedly (Strakonice District), a municipality and village in the South Bohemian Region
Dolní Novosedly, a municipality and village in the South Bohemian Region
Novosedly nad Nežárkou, a municipality and village and municipality in the South Bohemian Region